The Crimson Avenger is the name of three separate superheroes and supervillains in the DC Comics Universe. The character debuted in 1938 and is notable as the first masked hero in DC Comics.

The first Crimson Avenger, Lee Walter Travis, first appeared in Detective Comics #20 (October 1938). He is also known as a founding member of DC's second depicted superhero team, Seven Soldiers of Victory.

Fictional character biography

Lee Walter Travis

The Crimson Avenger (along with his sidekick Wing) first appeared in the DC Comics anthology American comic book series Detective Comics in issue #20.
The Crimson Avenger had many similarities to The Green Hornet, including a sidekick named Wing who was an Asian valet, and a gas gun that he used to subdue opponents.

Albert Elwood
Albert Elwood made a single appearance as the Crimson Avenger, in World's Finest Comics #131 (February 1963), in a story entitled "The Mystery of the Crimson Avenger". Eccentric inventor Albert Elwood adopted the guise and attempted to help Superman, Batman and Robin thwart the robberies of the Octopus Gang. A requisite identity confusion occurs when one of the Gang members assumed the Crimson Avenger's identity. Elwood helped the heroes capture the gang and retired right afterward. He had many sophisticated gadgets, but his efforts often proved counterproductive, more a hindrance than a help. Elwood did mention that he had "taken the name of a former lawman", meaning the by-then long defunct original Crimson Avenger.

After the introduction of the DC Comics multiverse in the 1960s, the original Crimson Avenger (Lee Travis) was explained to have lived on Earth-Two; Albert Elwood's Earth has never been specified.

Jill Carlyle
A female Crimson Avenger first appeared in Stars and S.T.R.I.P.E. #9 (April 2000), created by Geoff Johns and Scott Kolins. This version, like the original El Diablo, served as a minor Spirit of Vengeance. She was an African-American woman who possessed the powers of teleportation and intangibility. In a flashback sequence, it was revealed that Carlyle studied law but apparently lost a case in which the defendant was clearly guilty. She obtained a pair of Colt pistols originally owned by the first Crimson Avenger and used them to exact vengeance upon the unknown criminal. These guns are cursed such that, if the possessor uses them out of revenge, he or she will be cursed to track and kill those who have taken an innocent life. Carlyle becomes the Crimsom Avenger after taking revenge on the unknown criminal and, also as part of the curse, an ever-bleeding bullet hole appears on her chest. This version was never given a name, but is referred to by fans as Jill Carlyle, a name taken from the headstone of a victim the character was shown avenging in an early appearance. Whether the Avenger is Carlyle herself or not remains unclear.

While the Avenger's curse sends her after those who have taken an innocent life, an encounter with Wildcat and Power Girl reveals that "innocent" only has to mean that the victim was innocent of whatever circumstances led to their deaths. Crimson Avenger once targeted Wildcat for causing a man's death, but Wildcat revealed that his "victim" had already killed his own brother and the man's wife and son after they killed his fiancé; Wildcat planted evidence to frame the dead man for his fiancé's murder as he couldn't prove the man's real crime, and it was up to the legal system if the dead man was executed afterwards.

In the pages of "The New Golden Age", Crimson Avenger assembles the Seven Soldiers of Victory and takes them on a mission that involved Clock King using Per Degaton's time machine on the ship where Lee Travis sacrificed his life on.

Other versions
 In Michael Uslan's Elseworlds title Batman: Detective No. 27, the Crimson Avenger appears as part of an order of detectives including Alfred Pennyworth and Sam Spade and attempts to recruit Bruce Wayne.
 In The League of Extraordinary Gentlemen: Black Dossier, the Crimson Avenger is briefly mentioned as having met with Allan Quatermain and Mina Murray during the their self-exile from Britain during the years of the Ingsoc government. A photo of Allan and Murray standing in front of the Crimson Avenger's second costume is shown.
 The Crimson Avenger makes an appearance in the Justice League of America 80-Page Giant #1 comic (November 2009) in a story titled Zatanna & Black Canary in Fishnet Femmes Fatales!, when the two heroines are tossed back in time by the supervillain Epoch.
 In Kingdom Come, Alex Ross portrayed the character as a giant demon imprisoned in the Gulag. Naming him "King Crimson" in a nod to the band of the same name, his look owes more to his standard superhero look than his previous pulp fiction costume.
 In the pages of L.E.G.I.O.N., Garv assumed a masked identity after quitting the team, calling himself the Crimson Avenger. He dropped the identity when he returned to the team near the end of the series.
 In Blue Griffin Comics, a short lived comic endeavor, the forerunner super hero was to be named Crimson Avenger. His suit was more closely related to typical super hero style with bright red boots, gloves, trunks, and cape; while the rest of his outfit and mask were a darker shade of red. He sported a "C" crest on his chest and had energy manipulation powers similar to the Green Lantern, however he could not turn his energy projections into objects.

In other media

 The Lee Travis incarnation of the Crimson Avenger appears in Justice League Unlimited, mostly making non-speaking appearances but being voiced by an uncredited Kevin Conroy in the episode "This Little Piggy". This version is part of the expanded Justice League.
 The Lee Travis incarnation of the Crimson Avenger appears in the comic book tie-in Justice League Adventures.
 The Lee Travis incarnation of the Crimson Avenger appears in a photograph depicted in the Stargirl episode "Brainwave".

References

External links
Earth-2 Crimson Avenger (Travis) Index
Who's Who: Crimson Avenger (Elwood)

Articles about multiple fictional characters
DC Comics superheroes
DC Comics female superheroes
DC Comics supervillains
DC Comics titles
Fictional detectives
Golden Age superheroes
African-American superheroes
Comics characters introduced in 1963
Comics characters introduced in 2000
Fictional mass murderers
DC Comics characters who can teleport
Fictional characters who can turn intangible
Characters created by Geoff Johns
Vigilante characters in comics